The US Aircraft A-67 Dragon is a single-engine, propeller-driven, ground-attack aircraft.  It is designed for counter-insurgency (COIN), close air support (CAS), and intelligence, surveillance and reconnaissance (ISR) missions.  The A-67 is a low-cost aircraft built for low-intensity conflict situations, with a reported unit price of $4–5 million. The sole aircraft built is in storage at the MAPS Air Museum.

Specifications (A-67 prototype)

See also

References

External links
 US Aircraft A-67 web page
 A-67's New Home at MAPS Air Museum
"Dubai 2007: USAC seeking launch customer for low-cost Dragon". Flight Daily News, 13 November 2007.
 "New ISR/attack aircraft emerges in Ohio". C4ISR Journal, 16 January 2007.
"Warbird specialist flies A-67 Dragon". Flight International, 24 October 2006.
"A-67 Dragon counter-insurgency aircraft quietly makes first flight". Flight Global, 18 October 2006.
 "Boeing considers restarting OV-10 production after 23-year hiatus". Flight International, 1 February 2009.

A-67
2000s United States attack aircraft
Single-engined tractor aircraft
Single-engined turboprop aircraft
Low-wing aircraft
Aircraft first flown in 2006